This page is a list of political lists.

 List of annulled elections
 List of anti-nuclear protests in the United States
 List of basic political science topics
 List of basic public affairs topics
 List of civic and political organizations
 List of close elections
 List of confederations
 List of countries spanning more than one continent
 List of current heads of state and government
 List of current governments
 List of democracy and elections-related topics
 List of democratic socialist parties and organizations
 List of enclaves and exclaves
 List of government and military acronyms
 List of major social nudity organizations
 List of murdered political human rights activists
 List of national governments
 List of political metaphors
 List of political party symbols
 List of political scientists
 List of politics by country articles
 List of wars between democracies
 List of revolutions and rebellions
 List of rump states
 List of social democratic parties
 List of socialist countries
 List of socialist songs
 List of sovereign states
 List of suffragists and suffragettes
 List of timelines
 List of years in politics
 Lists of countries
 List of political parties by United Nations geoscheme

Political parties by country 

 List of ruling political parties by country
 List of political parties in Abkhazia
 List of political parties in Adjara
 List of political parties in Afghanistan
 List of political parties in Africa
 List of political parties in Akrotiri and Dhekelia
 List of political parties in Albania
 List of political parties in Algeria
 List of political parties in American Samoa
 List of political parties in Andorra
 List of political parties in Angola
 List of political parties in Anguilla
 List of political parties in Antigua and Barbuda
 List of political parties in Argentina
 List of political parties in Armenia
 List of political parties in Aruba
 List of political parties in Asia
 List of political parties in Australia
 List of political parties in Austria
 List of political parties in Azerbaijan
 List of political parties in Bahrain
 List of political parties in Bangladesh
 List of political parties in Barbados
 List of political parties in Belarus
 List of political parties in Belgium
 List of political parties in Belize
 List of political parties in Benin
 List of political parties in Bermuda
 List of political parties in Bhutan
 List of political parties in Bolivia
 List of political parties in Bosnia and Herzegovina
 List of political parties in Botswana
 List of political parties in Brazil
 List of political parties in Brunei
 List of political parties in Bulgaria
 List of political parties in Burkina Faso
 List of political parties in Burma
 List of political parties in Burundi
 List of political parties in Cambodia
 List of political parties in Cameroon
 List of political parties in Canada
 List of political parties in Cape Verde
 List of political parties in Ceuta
 List of political parties in Chad
 List of political parties in Chile
 List of political parties in China
 List of political parties in Christmas Island
 List of political parties in Colombia
 List of political parties in Comoros
 List of political parties in Costa Rica
 List of political parties in Crimea
 List of political parties in Croatia
 List of political parties in Cuba
 List of political parties in Cyprus
 List of political parties in Côte d'Ivoire
 List of political parties in Denmark
 List of political parties in Djibouti
 List of political parties in Dominica
 List of political parties in East Timor
 List of political parties in Ecuador
 List of political parties in Egypt
 List of political parties in El Salvador
 List of political parties in England
 List of political parties in Equatorial Guinea
 List of political parties in Eritrea
 List of political parties in Estonia
 List of political parties in Eswatini
 List of political parties in Ethiopia
 List of political parties in Europe
 List of political parties in Fiji
 List of political parties in Finland
 List of political parties in France
 List of political parties in French Guiana
 List of political parties in French Polynesia
 List of political parties in Gabon
 List of political parties in Gagauzia
 List of political parties in Georgia (country)
 List of political parties in Germany
 List of political parties in Ghana
 List of political parties in Gibraltar
 List of political parties in Greece
 List of political parties in Greenland
 List of political parties in Grenada
 List of political parties in Guadeloupe
 List of political parties in Guam
 List of political parties in Guatemala
 List of political parties in Guernsey
 List of political parties in Guinea
 List of political parties in Guinea-Bissau
 List of political parties in Guyana
 List of political parties in Haiti
 List of political parties in Honduras
 List of political parties in Hong Kong
 List of political parties in Hungary
 List of political parties in Iceland
 List of political parties in India
 List of political parties in Indonesia
 List of political parties in Iran
 List of political parties in Iraq
 List of political parties in Ireland
 List of political parties in Israel
 List of political parties in Italy
 List of political parties in Jamaica
 List of political parties in Jan Mayen
 List of political parties in Japan
 List of political parties in Jersey
 List of political parties in Jordan
 List of political parties in Kazakhstan
 List of political parties in Kenya
 List of political parties in Kiribati
 List of political parties in Kosovo
 List of political parties in Kuwait
 List of political parties in Kyrgyzstan
 List of political parties in Laos
 List of political parties in Latvia
 List of political parties in Lebanon
 List of political parties in Lesotho
 List of political parties in Liberia
 List of political parties in Libya
 List of political parties in Liechtenstein
 List of political parties in Lithuania
 List of political parties in Luxembourg
 List of political parties in Macau
 List of political parties in Madagascar
 List of political parties in Madeira
 List of political parties in Malawi
 List of political parties in Malaysia
 List of political parties in Mali
 List of political parties in Malta
 List of political parties in Martinique
 List of political parties in Mauritania
 List of political parties in Mauritius
 List of political parties in Mayotte
 List of political parties in Melilla
 List of political parties in Mexico
 List of political parties in Moldova
 List of political parties in Monaco
 List of political parties in Mongolia
 List of political parties in Montenegro
 List of political parties in Montserrat
 List of political parties in Morocco
 List of political parties in Mozambique
 List of political parties in Artsakh
 List of political parties in Nakhchivan
 List of political parties in Namibia
 List of political parties in Nauru
 List of political parties in Navassa Island
 List of political parties in Nepal
 List of political parties in New Caledonia
 List of political parties in New Zealand
 List of political parties in Nicaragua
 List of political parties in Niger
 List of political parties in Nigeria
 List of political parties in Niue
 List of political parties in Norfolk Island
 List of political parties in North America
 List of political parties in North Korea
 List of political parties in Northern Ireland
 List of political parties in Norway
 List of political parties in Oceania
 List of political parties in Oman
 List of political parties in Pakistan
 List of political parties in Palau
 List of political parties in Panama
 List of political parties in Papua New Guinea
 List of political parties in Paraguay
 List of political parties in Peru
 List of political parties in Poland
 List of political parties in Portugal
 List of political parties in Puerto Rico
 List of political parties in Puntland
 List of political parties in Qatar
 List of political parties in Romania
 List of political parties in Russia
 List of political parties in Rwanda
 List of political parties in Réunion
 List of political parties in Saint Barthélemy
 List of political parties in Saint Helena
 List of political parties in Saint Kitts and Nevis
 List of political parties in Saint Lucia
 List of political parties in Saint Martin (France)
 List of political parties in Saint Pierre and Miquelon
 List of political parties in Saint Vincent and the Grenadines
 List of political parties in Samoa
 List of political parties in San Marino
 List of political parties in Saudi Arabia
 List of political parties in Scotland
 List of political parties in Senegal
 List of political parties in Serbia
 List of political parties in Seychelles
 List of political parties in Sierra Leone
 List of political parties in Singapore
 List of political parties in Slovakia
 List of political parties in Slovenia
 List of political parties in Socotra
 List of political parties in Somalia
 List of political parties in Somaliland
 List of political parties in South Africa
 List of political parties in South America
 List of political parties in South Georgia and the South Sandwich Islands
 List of political parties in South Korea
 List of political parties in South Ossetia
 List of political parties in Southern Sudan
 List of political parties in Spain
 List of political parties in Sri Lanka
 List of political parties in Sudan
 List of political parties in Suriname
 List of political parties in Svalbard

 List of political parties in Sweden
 List of political parties in Switzerland
 List of political parties in Syria
 List of political parties in São Tomé and Príncipe
 List of political parties in Taiwan
 List of political parties in Tajikistan
 List of political parties in Tanzania
 List of political parties in Thailand
 List of political parties in Togo
 List of political parties in Tokelau
 List of political parties in Tonga
 List of political parties in Transnistria
 List of political parties in Trinidad and Tobago
 List of political parties in Tunisia
 List of political parties in Turkey
 List of political parties in Turkmenistan
 List of political parties in Tuvalu
 List of political parties in Uganda
 List of political parties in Ukraine
 List of political parties in Uruguay
 List of political parties in Uzbekistan
 List of political parties in Vanuatu
 List of political parties in Venezuela
 List of political parties in Vietnam
 List of political parties in Wales
 List of political parties in Wallis and Futuna
 List of political parties in Western Sahara
 List of political parties in Yemen
 List of political parties in Zambia
 List of political parties in Zanzibar
 List of political parties in Zimbabwe
 List of political parties in the Azores
 List of political parties in the Bahamas
 List of political parties in the British Virgin Islands
 List of political parties in the Canary Islands
 List of political parties in the Cayman Islands
 List of political parties in the Central African Republic
 List of political parties in the Cocos (Keeling) Islands
 List of political parties in the Cook Islands
 List of political parties in the Czech Republic
 List of political parties in the Democratic Republic of the Congo
 List of political parties in the Dominican Republic
 List of political parties in the Falkland Islands
 List of political parties in the Faroe Islands
 List of political parties in the Federated States of Micronesia
 List of political parties in the Gambia
 List of political parties in the Isle of Man
 List of political parties in the Maldives
 List of political parties in the Marshall Islands
 List of political parties in the Netherlands
 List of political parties in the Netherlands Antilles
 List of political parties in the Northern Mariana Islands
 List of political parties in the People's Republic of China
 List of political parties in the Philippines
 List of political parties in the Pitcairn Islands
 List of political parties in the Republic of Macedonia
 List of political parties in the Republic of the Congo
 List of political parties in the Solomon Islands
 List of political parties in the Turkish Republic of Northern Cyprus
 List of political parties in the Turks and Caicos Islands
 List of political parties in the United Arab Emirates
 List of political parties in the United Kingdom
 List of political parties in the United States
 List of political parties in the United States Virgin Islands
 List of political parties in the Vatican City
 List of political parties in Åland